Agustín Auzmendi (born 1 February 1997) is an Argentine professional footballer who plays as a forward for Olancho F.C.

Career
Auzmendi began his career with Acassuso; joining in 2013. He was promoted into their first-team squad for the back end of the 2016–17 Primera B Metropolitana campaign, making his professional debut on 10 May 2017 versus Fénix. He featured three times off the bench in total, with the third match including Auzmendi's first senior goal in a 4–1 victory over Tristán Suárez on 17 June. He appeared just once in 2017–18, prior to becoming a regular member in 2018–19 as he played in twenty-one of their opening thirty-one fixtures; ten of which as a starter.

Career statistics
.

References

External links

1997 births
Living people
Sportspeople from Buenos Aires Province
Argentine footballers
Association football forwards
Primera B Metropolitana players
Club Atlético Acassuso footballers